Filip Dewulf (born 15 March 1972) is a former professional male tennis player from Belgium.

In his career, he won two ATP Tour singles titles and one title in doubles. In 1997 he reached the semifinals of the French Open, his best singles result ever and the first Belgian tennis player (male or female) to reach the semi-final at a Grand Slam tournament. He defeated Cristiano Caratti, Fernando Meligeni, Albert Portas, Àlex Corretja and Magnus Norman before he was defeated in four sets by the eventual champion, Gustavo Kuerten. This was, according to Roland Garros itself, the best performance that a qualifier has performed at a French Open, and only the third time in Grand Slam history that a qualifier had reached a semi-final. Dewulf would also reach the quarter-finals at the same event the following year, falling to eventual runner-up Àlex Corretja in straight sets. His career-high singles ranking was world No. 39, achieved in September 1997; he became the first Belgian in ATP Top 50, overall finishing four seasons as the top-ranked Belgian player.

ATP career finals

Singles: 2 (2 titles)

Doubles: 1 (1 title)

ATP Challenger and ITF Futures finals

Singles: 6 (1–5)

Doubles: 10 (6–4)

Performance timeline

Singles

References

External links
 
 
 

1972 births
Living people
Belgian male tennis players
People from Mol, Belgium
Sportspeople from Limburg (Belgium)
20th-century Belgian people